Joan of Portugal ( [ʒuˈɐnɐ]; 31 March 1439 – June 13, 1475) was the Queen of Castile as the second wife of King Henry IV of Castile. The posthumous daughter of King Edward of Portugal and Eleanor of Aragon, she was born in the Quinta do Monte Olivete Villa, Almada.

Queen of Castile 
On 21 May 1455 in Cordova, she married as his second wife King Henry IV of Castile who had repudiated his first consort, Blanche II of Navarre, after thirteen years of marriage. It was rumoured that their marriage had never been consummated due to the king's impotence. Henry and Joan shared the same maternal grandparents; Ferdinand I of Aragon and Eleanor of Alburquerque  (making them first cousins). They also shared the same paternal great-grandfather; John of Gaunt, 1st Duke of Lancaster  (making them second cousins). In February 1462, six years after Joan's marriage to Henry, she gave birth to a daughter, also named Joan, called La Beltraneja because of rumours that she was in fact the daughter of Don Beltrán de la Cueva, 1st Duke of Alburquerque, who was suspected of being Joan's lover. 

Henry banished Joan from the royal court and she went to live in Coca at the castle of Henry's supporter, Bishop Fonseca. She soon fell in love with Bishop Fonseca's nephew; they embarked on a sexual affair, which resulted in Joan bearing her lover two illegitimate sons. Henry subsequently declared their marriage had never been legal and thus divorced her in 1468.

At the death of her former husband in 1474, Joan championed her daughter's right to succeed to the throne, but she died shortly thereafter. This led to the outbreak of the War of the Castilian Succession (1475–1479).

Scandals and illegitimate children 

Prior to her banishment, Joan had provoked much criticism in the Castilian court as she allegedly wore dresses that displayed too much décolletage, and her philandering with men was considered scandalous. She was considered haughty, unscrupulous, ambitious and ruthless, participating in intrigues and completely controlling her husband. Joan has been credited with many lovers, including the poet Juan Rodríguez de la Cámara.
Joan had two illegitimate children by Pedro de Castilla y Fonseca "el mozo", nephew of Bishop Fonseca, and a great grandson of King Pedro of Castille: 
Her two sons were Pedro de Castilla y Portugal  married to Joana de Mendonza and Andres Apostol de Castilla y Portugal married to Mencía de Quinones. 
The birth of her two illegitimate children only added to Joan's considerable notoriety.

She later entered the convent of San Francisco in Segovia. 

Joan died in Madrid on June 13, 1475 at the age of 36. She was buried in the Convent of San Francisco.

Ancestry

References 

1439 births
1475 deaths
House of Aviz
House of Trastámara
Castilian queen consorts
Leonese queen consorts
Galician queens consort
Repudiated queens
Portuguese infantas
People from Almada
15th-century Portuguese people
15th-century Spanish women
Daughters of kings